WETB (790 AM) is a radio station broadcasting a classic hits format. Licensed to Johnson City, Tennessee, United States, it serves the Tri-Cities, Tennessee area. The station is currently owned by Kenneth C. Hill.

At one time WETB had to sign off at sunset, but was later granted a very low nighttime power.

790 AM is a regional broadcast frequency.

History
In the 1960s and 1970s, WETB played Top 40. In the late 80s it was "East Tennessee's Beautiful 79".

References

External links

ETB
Classic hits radio stations in the United States